God's Creatures may refer to:

 God's Creatures - 1913 painting by Eugen von Blaas.
 God's Creatures - 2022 psychological drama film directed by Saela Davis and Anna Rose Holmer.

Disambiguation pages